Vered Borochovski (born 27 August 1984 in Ashdod) is a former Israeli swimmer who represented Israel at the 2000 and 2004 Summer Olympics. She swam without her goggles at the 2004 Olympics, because they had a torn strap.

She also holds three Israeli swimming records.

In December 2002 she competed at the Jerusalem Cup. She swam a time of 27.38 in the 50m fly.

Currently held records

References

External links
 

1984 births
Living people
Sportspeople from Ashdod
Israeli Jews
Israeli female swimmers
Jewish swimmers
Olympic swimmers of Israel
Swimmers at the 2000 Summer Olympics
Swimmers at the 2004 Summer Olympics
Medalists at the FINA World Swimming Championships (25 m)
Female butterfly swimmers